Markus Johannes Wolf (19 January 1923 – 9 November 2006), also known as Mischa, was head of the Main Directorate for Reconnaissance, the foreign intelligence division of East Germany's Ministry for State Security (abbreviated MfS, commonly known as the ). He was the Stasi's number two for 34 years, which spanned most of the Cold War. He is often regarded as one of the best-known spymasters during the Cold War. In the West he was known as "the man without a face" due to his elusiveness.

Life and career

Early life and education
Wolf was born 19 January 1923, in Hechingen, Province of Hohenzollern (now Baden-Württemberg), to a Jewish father and a non-Jewish German mother. His father was the writer, communist activist and physician Friedrich Wolf (1888–1953) and his mother was the nursery teacher Else Wolf ( Dreibholz; 1898–1973). He had one brother, the film director Konrad Wolf (1925–1982). His father was a member of the Communist Party of Germany, and after the anti-socialist and anti-Semitic Nazi Party gained power in 1933, Wolf emigrated to Moscow with his father, via Switzerland and France, because of their communist convictions and because Wolf's father was Jewish.

During his exile, Wolf first attended the German Karl Liebknecht School and later a Russian school. In 1936, at the age of 13, he obtained Soviet identity documents.

Career
After finishing school, Wolf entered the Moscow Institute of Airplane Engineering (Moscow Aviation Institute) in 1940, which was evacuated to Alma Ata after Nazi Germany's attack on the Soviet Union. There he was told to join the Comintern in 1942, where he among others was prepared for undercover work behind enemy lines. He also worked as a newsreader for German People's Radio after the dissolution of the Comintern, from 1943 until 1945.

After the war he was sent to Berlin with the Ulbricht Group, led by Walter Ulbricht, to work as a journalist for a radio station in the Soviet Zone of occupation. He was among those journalists who observed the entire Nuremberg trials against the principal Nazi leaders. Between 1949 and 1951 Wolf worked at the East German embassy in the Soviet Union. That same year he joined the Ministry for State Security (Stasi).

In December 1952, at the age of 29, Wolf was among the founding members of the foreign intelligence service within the Ministry for State Security. As intelligence chief, he achieved great success in penetrating the government, political and business circles of West Germany with spies. The most notable individual in this regard was Günter Guillaume, who was secretary to and close friend of West German Chancellor Willy Brandt, and whose exposure as an East German agent led to Brandt's resignation in 1974.

For most of his career, Wolf was known as "the man without a face" due to his elusiveness. An East German defector, Werner Stiller, then identified Wolf to West German counter-intelligence as the man in the picture. It has also been suggested that elements within the CIA had identified him by 1959 from photographs of attendees at the Nuremberg trials.

Retirement

He retired in 1986 with the rank of Generaloberst, being succeeded by Werner Grossmann as head of the East German foreign intelligence service. He continued the work of his late brother Konrad in writing the story of their upbringing in Moscow in the 1930s. The book Troika came out on the same day in East and West Germany.

During the Peaceful Revolution, Wolf distanced himself from the hardline position taken by Erich Honecker, favouring reform. He spoke at the November 1989 Alexanderplatz demonstration, where he was both booed and applauded by a highly divided crowd during his speech. Calls to "stop" the speech, even to "hang" Wolf could be heard.  The dissident Bärbel Bohley would later say:  

In September 1990, shortly before German reunification, Wolf fled the country, and sought political asylum in Russia and Austria. When denied, he returned to Germany, where he was brutally beaten and arrested by German police. Wolf claimed to have refused an offer of a large amount of money, a new identity with plastic surgery to change his features, and a home in California from the Central Intelligence Agency to defect to the United States.

In 1993, he was convicted of treason by the  Düsseldorf and sentenced to six years' imprisonment. This was later quashed by the German supreme court, because West Germany was a separate country at the time. In 1997, he was convicted of unlawful detention, coercion, and bodily harm, and was given a suspended sentence of two years' imprisonment. He was additionally sentenced to three days' imprisonment for refusing to testify against  when the former West German (SPD) politician was accused in 1993 of atomic espionage. Wolf said that Flämig was not the agent that he had mentioned in his memoirs.

Markus Wolf died in his sleep at his Berlin home on 9 November 2006.

In 2011 the State Social Court of Berlin-Brandenburg ruled that the widow Andrea Wolf was not entitled to a "compensation pension" that her husband had been stripped of as a "fighter against fascism".

Cultural impact
John le Carré's fictional spymaster Karla, a Russian, who appears in Tinker, Tailor, Soldier, Spy, The Honourable Schoolboy, and Smiley's People was believed by some readers to be modeled on Wolf. However, the writer has repeatedly denied it, and did so once again when interviewed on the occasion of Wolf's death. Le Carré has also stated that it is "sheer nonsense" to claim that Wolf was the inspiration for the character Fiedler in The Spy Who Came in from the Cold. Although Fiedler is a German Jew who spent World War II in exile and then gained a senior position in East Germany's Intelligence Service, Carré said he had no idea who Markus Wolf was at the time of the writing of the book. He added that he considered Wolf to be the moral equivalent of Albert Speer. He maintained that a character's code name Wolf in an early draft of the book was a coincidence and that the name came from the brand of his lawn mower. He renamed the character after being told that there was an actual Wolf in East German intelligence.

Conversely, Wolf stated that The Spy Who Came In From the Cold was the only book he read for a period in the early 1960s, and was surprised how accurately it presented the reality within the East German security services. He wondered if le Carré had had special information about the situation within the Ministry of State Security.

Wolf appears as a character in Frederick Forsyth's novel The Deceiver. In the section titled "Pride and Extreme Prejudice", a KGB officer liaises with East German intelligence while tracking down a British agent in East Germany. Forsyth also mentions Wolf in his earlier novel The Fourth Protocol, describing him, and the East German intelligence service as a whole, as masters of the false flag recruitment technique.

Personal life

He was married three times. In 1944, he married his first wife Emmy Stenzer, the daughter of the German Communist Franz Stenzer, and who was the curator of the archives of Friedrich Wolf, Markus Wolf's father. His third wife was Claudia. He had two daughters Tanja Trögel and Claudia Wall and a son .

Tanja Trögel continued her family passion supporting leftist activities. She is the director of the Friedrich Wolf Memorial in Lehnitz.

Claudia Wall (b. 1969 or 1970), a step daughter of Markus Wolf, was married from autumn 1997 until late 2008 to Hans Wall, the founder of an outdoor and street furniture firm Wall AG. She had two daughters Elisabeth (b. 1996 or 1997) from her first marriage and Johanna (b. 1997 or 1998) from her second marriage which was to Hans Wall.

Franz Wolf (b. May 1953, Berlin) is a Gibraltar-based manager of a network of companies owned by Mikhail Fridman.

References

Bibliography
 Wolf, Markus (with Anne McElvoy); Memoirs of a Spymaster; Pimlico; ; (paperback 1997). Also published under the title Man Without a Face: The Memoirs of a Spymaster (Jonathan Cape, 1997). Wolf wrote six books between 1989 and 2002 but this is the only one translated into English.
 Dany Kuchel wrote in 2011, The Sword and the Shield, a story of the Stasi in France.

1923 births
2006 deaths
East German spies
Cold War spies
Collaborators with the Soviet Union
Spymasters
German communists
Stasi officers
Stasi officers convicted of crimes
Criminals from Baden-Württemberg
Refugees from Nazi Germany in the Soviet Union
German people of Jewish descent
People from Hechingen
People from the Province of Hohenzollern
International Lenin School alumni
People from East Berlin
People of the Cold War